William Mark Saltzman was named the Goizueta Foundation Professor of Biomedical and Chemical Engineering at Yale University on July 1, 2002 and became the founding chair of Yale's Department of Biomedical Engineering in 2003. Saltzman's research aims to promote new methods for drug delivery and develop new biotechnologies to combat human disease. A pioneer in the fields of biomaterials, nanobiotechnology, and tissue engineering, Saltzman has contributed to the design and implementation of a number of clinical technologies that have become essential to medical practice today. His popular course Frontiers of Biomedical Engineering is available to everyone through Open Yale Courses.

Biography
Saltzman received a B.S. in Chemical Engineering in 1981 from Iowa State University, followed by a M.S. in Chemical Engineering in 1984 and a Ph.D. in Medical Engineering in 1987, both at the Massachusetts Institute of Technology.

As a graduate student at the Massachusetts Institute of Technology (MIT), Saltzman built scaffolds that could be seeded with cells to sculpt new replacement tissues. He also created drug-impregnated implants from polymers that slowly and steadily release medicines for long periods—work that now helps patients in the form of GLIADEL, a chemotherapy-loaded polymer wafer that neurosurgeons implant in the brain to combat glioblastoma multiforme (GBM), one of the most aggressive types of malignant brain tumors.

He was appointed Assistant Professor of Chemical Engineering at Johns Hopkins University in 1987 and received a joint appointment in the Department of Biomedical Engineering at The Johns Hopkins School of Medicine in 1990. He was promoted to Associate Professor in 1992 and to Professor in 1995. In 1996, he moved to Cornell University, holding the first BP Amoco/H. Laurance Fuller Chair in Chemical Engineering.

He joined the faculty at Yale University, as the Goizueta Foundation Professor of Chemical and Biomedical Engineering, in July 2002 and became the first chair of Yale's Department of Biomedical Engineering in 2003. Since he arrived at Yale in 2002 to form the new department, he has seen his faculty group grow to 19 members. He hired slowly, knowing that each new person would have a significant effect on the overall department culture. Saltzman settled on four areas to excel in: imaging, biomolecular engineering, biomechanics, and systems biology. The department has developed largely as its founders envisioned—multidisciplinary, collegial, integrated with the medical school, and committed to undergraduate education.

As of July 1, 2016, Saltzman serves as Head of Jonathan Edwards College at Yale University.

Research

Saltzman's research focuses on developing the most economical, transportable and accessible methods for disease prevention and methods to more effectively deliver chemotherapy to the most aggressive forms of brain tumors. Dr. Saltzman's research interests include controlled drug delivery to the brain, polymers for supplementing or stimulating the immune system, cell interactions with polymers, and tissue engineering. He studies how to create safer and more effective medical and surgical therapy based on tissue engineering. Dr. Saltzman worked with an interdisciplinary team to develop what is now the standard of care for treating brain tumors.

Awards and honors
 Elected Member, National Academy of Engineering (2018) 
 Elected Member, National Academy of Medicine (formerly Institute of Medicine) (2014)
 Mines Medalist, South Dakota School of Mines (2014)
 Fellow, National Academy of Inventors (2013)
 Fellow, Biomedical Engineering Society (2010)

 Sheffield Teaching Prize, Yale University (2009)
 Paper selected as one of top 25 published over past 25 years in Biomaterials (2006)
 Distinguished Lecturer Award, Biomedical Engineering Society (2004)
 BP Amoco/H.Laurence Fuller Chair in Chemical Engineering at Cornell (2001)
 Britton Chance Distinguished Lecturer in Engineering and Medicine, at the University of Pennsylvania (2000)
 Professional Progress in Engineering Award from Iowa State University (2000)
 Member, Surgery & Bioengineering Study Section (NIH) (1999)
 Richard Tucker Excellence in Teaching Award (Cornell) (1999)
 Fellow, American Institute for Medical and Biological Engineering (1997)
 Controlled Release Society Young Investigator Award (1996)
 Allan C. Davis Medal as Maryland's Outstanding Young Engineer (1995)
 Distinguished Faculty Award for Excellence in Undergraduate Education (Johns Hopkins) (1995)
 Camille and Henry Dreyfus Foundation Teacher-Scholar Award. (1990)

Works
Books
 Drug Delivery: Engineering Principles for Drug Therapy, 2001, Published by Oxford University Press.
 Tissue Engineering: Engineering principles for the design of replacement organs and tissues, 2004, Published by Oxford University Press.
 Biomedical Engineering: Bridging Medicine and Technology, Second Edition, 2015, Published by Cambridge University Press.

Selected Publications

References

Living people
Cornell University faculty
Yale University faculty
Johns Hopkins University faculty
1959 births
Fellows of the American Institute for Medical and Biological Engineering
Fellows of the Biomedical Engineering Society
Members of the National Academy of Medicine